The Partenavia P.52 Tigrotto was a 1950s Italian light aircraft built by Partenavia in Naples.

Development
The Tigrotto was a low-wing cabin monoplane with a retractable tailwheel landing gear. It had two-seats side-by-side and was powered by an 85 hp (63 kW) Continental C85 engine. The prototype and only Tigrotto, registered I-CARB, first flew in 1953.

Specifications

References

Notes

Bibliography

 

Tigrotto
1950s Italian civil utility aircraft
Low-wing aircraft
Aircraft first flown in 1953